Giuseppe Tatarella, better known as Pinuccio Tatarella, (17 September 1935 – 8 February 1999) was an Italian politician who served as deputy prime minister in the first cabinet of Silvio Berlusconi from 1994 to 1995.

Early life and education
Tatarella was born in Cerignola, Apulia, in 1935. He held a law degree.

Career
Tatarella was a lawyer and journalist. He worked for the local branches of neo-fascist Italian Social Movement party, which was launched by Benito Mussolini's followers in 1946 based on his strong nationalistic ideals. In the 1960s he launched the weekly Puglia D'Oggi (Italian: Puglia Today). In 1970, he became a member of the Puglia regional council. In 1979, he was first elected to the Parliament and retained his seat until 1999. 

Tatarella was among the cofounders of National Alliance (AN) that was established in January 1994. He became one of its senior member. The party was the continuation of the Italian Social Movement. He served as floor leader of the AN at the parliament for a long time. In 1996, he took over the Il Roma, a Naples-based daily, and served as its editor until 1999.

He was appointed deputy prime minister to the first cabinet of Silvio Berlusconi, which was the first right-wing cabinet of Italy after World War II, on 10 May 1994. He also served as minister of post and telecommunications in the same cabinet and was one of four AN members in the Berlusconi's first cabinet. However, only his appointment was regarded as significant. Indeed he was surnamed minister of harmony. Tatarella was in office until 1995. He also won his seat from Bari in the elections held on 22 April 1996. In January 1997, he was named as the head of a parliamentary subcommittee, named form of government. It was one of four subcommittees that constituted a bicameral committee of parliament set up to discuss the institutional reorganization of Italy.

Views and reactions
Although Tatarella was described and viewed as a fascist, he never admitted it and stated "I am a nationalist, a Catholic and a democrat." Belgian minister Elio Di Rupo refused to shake Tatarella's hand during a meeting in Brussels when Tatarella was serving as deputy prime minister and ministry of posts and telecommunications. It was due to the negative image of the AN.

Death
Tatarella died of a heart attack at a hospital in Turin at age 63 on 8 February 1999. A funeral service was performed for him in Bari.

References

External links
Historical Portal of Chamber of Deputies

20th-century Italian journalists
20th-century Italian lawyers
20th-century Italian male writers
1935 births
1999 deaths
Italian Roman Catholics
Italian Social Movement politicians
National Alliance (Italy) politicians
Deputies of Legislature VIII of Italy
Deputies of Legislature IX of Italy
Deputies of Legislature X of Italy
Deputies of Legislature XI of Italy
Deputies of Legislature XII of Italy
Deputies of Legislature XIII of Italy
Politicians of Apulia
Italian male journalists
Deputy Prime Ministers of Italy
People from Cerignola
Italian newspaper founders
Italian newspaper editors
Italian political party founders
Government ministers of Italy
Conservatism in Italy